"Jennifer's Body" is a song written and performed by American alternative rock band Hole, from their 1994 album Live Through This.

Origin and recording
According to drummer Patty Schemel, she and Courtney Love came up with the idea for the song in 1992 while in San Francisco; at the time, Love's husband Kurt Cobain was working with Melvins on their album Lysol (1992). The song was recorded at Triclops Studios in October 1993 during the recording sessions for Live Through This. Schemel recalled that the song was recorded in two takes.

Composition and lyrics
The general theme of the lyrics deal with a woman's kidnapping and dismemberment. According to Everett True, the song was thought to be inspired by Jennie Boddy, a music publicist. Its lyrics appear to tell the narrative of a woman in captivity, being held "in a box by the bed", before eventually being murdered and dismembered.

Interpretation
The song has been interpreted by feminist scholars as being about literal violence against a woman's body, as well as using "corporeal fragmentation," representing a woman's body being enjoyed "piecemeal in objectified parts." The song's ending with the repeated lines "Just relax, just relax, just go to sleep," have been interpreted by feminist scholars as assuming the role of a male aggressor speaking to his female victim who is either being lulled to sleep, or experiencing death.

References

Bibliography

1994 songs
Hole (band) songs
Songs with feminist themes
Songs about death
Songs written by Eric Erlandson
Songs written by Courtney Love